Bandipore district (also spelt as Bandipora or Bandipur) is one of the 20 districts in the Indian union territory of Jammu and Kashmir. Bandipore town is the administrative headquarters of the district. Bandipore, a township with peculiar scenic beauty is located in the foothills of the snow-clad peaks of Harmukh overlooking the shores of Wular Lake and has produced hundreds of scholars and intellectuals. The district is famous for its tourist places such as Wular Vintage Park, Athwatoo and Gurez valley. Before 1947, this town was a big trade and literary centre of Kashmir. This district was carved out from the erstwhile Baramulla district in 2007. The district is bounded by Kupwara district from the north, Baramulla district from west and Kargil district in Ladakh and Ganderbal district from the east. This district occupies an area of 398 km2. The district has a population of 392,232 as per 2011 census.

Education 
Some of the institutions and colleges of Bandipur which provide quality education to the students of district Bandipore.
 Govt Girls Higher Secondary School, Plan Bandipora
 Govt NM Boys Higher School Kaloosa
 Govt Higher Secondary school Quilmuqam
 Govt Polytechnic College Bandipora
 Govt HKM Degree College Patushay
 Islamiya Model School Patushay
 Govt Middle School Patushay Kendriya Vidyalaya BSF Bandipur.
 Al-Noor College Of Education moder
 Mehboobul Aalam College Of Education
 Govt High School Bagh]
 Govt High School Qazipora bandipora
 Muslim Model School Qazipora Watapora
 Army Good Will School Aythmulla
 Shaheen College Of Education
 Govt Higher Sec. School Nadihal
 Govt Higher Sec. School Aloosa
 Govt Higher Sec. School Aragam
 Govt Secondary School Mantrigam
 Govt Secondary School Bonakoot
 Eaglets Public Secondary School Plan
 SMS Islamia Model Higher Secondary School, Garoora
 Government Higher Secondary School, Arin

Divisions 
The district comprises seven tehsils: Ajas, Aloosa, Bandipore, Sumbal, Hajin, Gurez and Tulail. The district has three Vidhan Sabha constituencies: Gurez, Bandipore and Sonawari. All of these are part of Baramulla Lok Sabha constituency.
The district comprises twelve community development blocks: Aloosa, Arin, Baktoor, Bandipore, Bonkoot, Ganastan, Gurez, Hajin, Naidkhai, Nowgam, Sumbal and Tulail.

Demographics 

According to the 2011 census Bandipore district has a population of 392,232, roughly equal to the nation of Maldives. This gives it a ranking of 561st in India (out of a total of 640). Its population growth rate over the decade 2001–2011 was 26.31%. Bandipore has a sex ratio of 899 females for every 1000 males (this varies with religion), and a literacy rate of 57.82%.

At the time of the 2011 census, 82.39% of the population spoke Kashmiri, 8,82% Gojri, 4.18% Shina, 1.91% Pahari and 1.27% Hindi as their first language.

See also 
 Wular Lake
 Gurez Valley
 Patushay
 QUIL MUQAM
 Aathwatoo

References

External links 
 Official Website 
 Bandipora Tourism Guide

2007 establishments in Jammu and Kashmir
 
Districts of Jammu and Kashmir